In photography and optics, vignetting is a reduction of an image's brightness or saturation toward the periphery compared to the image center. The word vignette, from the same root as vine, originally referred to a decorative border in a book. Later, the word came to be used for a photographic portrait that is clear at the center and fades off toward the edges. A similar effect is visible in photographs of projected images or videos off a projection screen, resulting in a so-called "hotspot" effect.

Vignetting is often an unintended and undesired effect caused by camera settings or lens limitations.  However, it is sometimes deliberately introduced for creative effect, such as to draw attention to the center of the frame. A photographer may deliberately choose a lens that is known to produce vignetting to obtain the effect, or it may be introduced with the use of special filters or post-processing procedures.

When using superzoom lenses, vignetting may occur all along the zoom range, depending on the aperture and the focal length. However, it may not always be visible, except at the widest end (the shortest focal length). In these cases, vignetting may cause an exposure value (EV) difference of up to 0.75EV.

Causes
There are several causes of vignetting. Sidney F. Ray distinguishes the following types:

 Mechanical vignetting
 Optical vignetting
 Natural vignetting

A fourth cause is unique to digital imaging:
 Pixel vignetting

A fifth cause is unique to analog imaging:
 Photographic film vignetting

Mechanical vignetting
Mechanical vignetting occurs when light beams emanating from object points located off-axis are partially blocked by external objects such as thick or stacked filters, secondary lenses, and improper lens hoods. This has the effect of changing the entrance pupil shape as a function of angle (resulting in the path of light being partially blocked). Darkening can be gradual or abrupt – the smaller the aperture, the more abrupt the vignetting as a function of angle. 

When some points on an image receives no light at all due to mechanical vignetting (the paths of light to these image points is completely blocked), then this results in a restriction of the field of view (FOV) – parts of the image are then completely black.

Optical vignetting
This type of vignetting is caused by the physical dimensions of a multiple element lens. Rear elements are shaded by elements in front of them, which reduces the effective lens opening for off-axis incident light. The result is a gradual decrease in light intensity towards the image periphery. Optical vignetting is sensitive to the lens aperture and can often be cured by a reduction in aperture of 2–3 stops. (An increase in the F-number.)

Natural vignetting
Unlike the previous types, natural vignetting (also known as natural illumination falloff) is not due to the blocking of light rays. The falloff is approximated by the cos4 or "cosine fourth" law of illumination falloff. Here, the light falloff is proportional to the fourth power of the cosine of the angle at which the light impinges on the film or sensor array. Wideangle rangefinder designs and the lens designs used in compact cameras are particularly prone to natural vignetting. Telephoto lenses, retrofocus wideangle lenses used on SLR cameras, and telecentric designs in general are less troubled by natural vignetting. A gradual grey filter or postprocessing techniques may be used to compensate for natural vignetting, as it cannot be cured by stopping down the lens. Some modern lenses are specifically designed so that the light strikes the image perpendicular or nearly so, eliminating or greatly reducing vignetting.

Pixel vignetting 
Pixel vignetting only affects digital cameras and is caused by angle-dependence of the digital sensors. Light incident on the sensor at normal incident produces a stronger signal than light hitting it at an oblique angle. Most digital cameras use built-in image processing to compensate for optical vignetting and pixel vignetting when converting raw sensor data to standard image formats such as JPEG or TIFF. The use of offset microlenses over the image sensor can also reduce the effect of pixel vignetting.

Post-shoot 
For artistic effect, vignetting is sometimes applied to an otherwise un-vignetted photograph and can be achieved by burning the outer edges of the photograph (with film stock) or using digital imaging techniques, such as masking darkened edges. The Lens Correction filter in Photoshop can also achieve the same effect.

In digital imaging, this technique is used to create a low fidelity (photography) appearance in the picture.

See also
 Dodging and burning
 Feathering
 Flat-field correction
 Metering mode
 Vignette (philately)

Footnotes

References
 Van Walree's webpage on vignetting uses some unorthodox terminology, but illustrates very well the physics and optics of mechanical and optical vignetting.
 Peter B. Catrysse, Xinqiao Liu, and Abbas El Gamal: QE Reduction due to Pixel Vignetting in CMOS Image Sensors; in Morley M. Blouke, Nitin Sampat, George M. Williams, Jr., Thomas Yeh (ed.): Sensors and Camera Systems for Scientific, Industrial, and Digital Photography Applications, Proceedings of SPIE, vol. 3965 (2000).
 Yuanjie Zheng, Stephen Lin, and Sing Bing Kang, Single-Image Vignetting Correction;  IEEE Conference on Computer Vision and Pattern Recognition 2006
 Olsen, Doug; Dou, Changyong; Zhang, Xiaodong; Hu, Lianbo; Kim, Hojin; Hildum, Edward. 2010. "Radiometric Calibration for AgCam" Remote Sens. 2, no. 2: 464-477.

Science of photography
Photographic techniques
Optics